Neal Caloia (born April 9, 1970) is an American sports shooter. He competed in two events at the 1996 Summer Olympics.

References

External links
 

1970 births
Living people
American male sport shooters
Olympic shooters of the United States
Shooters at the 1996 Summer Olympics
People from Cottage Grove, Oregon